Michael Unterbuchner (born 23 May 1988) is a German professional darts player who currently plays in World Darts Federation (WDF) events. He reached the semi-finals of the BDO World Darts Championship on two of his three appearances. In 2021–2022 he was the holder of the PDC Tour Card and played in Professional Darts Corporation (PDC) events.

Career
In 2017, Unterbuchner reached the last 48 of the World Masters. He qualified for the 2018 BDO World Darts Championship as one of the Playoff Qualifiers and played David Cameron in the preliminary round, winning 3–2. Unterbuchner became the first German player to reach a semi-final at a World Championship, as well as the first to win a last 16 match at a World Championship, when he caused an upset by beating No. 3 seed Jamie Hughes 3–2 in the first round, No. 14 seed Martin Phillips 4–2 in the second round, and No. 11 seed Richard Veenstra 5–4 in the quarter final. Unterbuchner played No. 2 seed and BDO No. 1 Mark McGeeney in the semi-finals where he lost 4–6.

In 2020, Unterbuchner attended Q School but was unable to get a TourCard, He did however qualify for 2 PDC European Tour events, losing 6-4 to Darius Labanaukas & again 6-4 this time to Scott Baker.

Unterbuchner also took part in the German Super League where he qualified for the Semi Final before losing 9-3 to Dragutin Horvat, with the event being won by Nico Kurz.

Unterbuchner won a PDC Tour Card for the first time during the PDC Q-School in February 2021. During his two-year adventure with the Professional Darts Corporation, he earned just only £4,000. At that time, he did not start in a televised tournament. In 2023, after losing the PDC Tour Card, he took part in the jubilee 2023 Dutch Open, confirming his return to competition in World Darts Federation tournaments.

World Championship results

BDO

 2018: Semi-finals (lost to Mark McGeeney 4–6) (sets)
 2019: Semi-finals (lost to Scott Waites 1–6)
 2020: Second round (lost to Scott Mitchell 0–4)

Career finals

BDO major finals: 0 (1 runner-up)

Performance timeline

References

External links
 

Living people
German darts players
British Darts Organisation players
1988 births
Professional Darts Corporation former tour card holders
Sportspeople from Munich